António Manuel da Costa Nogueira (born 10 July 1951 in Lisbon) is a Portuguese retired footballer who played as a central midfielder.

External links

1951 births
Living people
Footballers from Lisbon
Portuguese footballers
Association football midfielders
Primeira Liga players
Liga Portugal 2 players
Atlético Clube de Portugal players
S.C. Braga players
Boavista F.C. players
C.F. Os Belenenses players
Sporting CP footballers
Portugal international footballers